is a Japanese politician serving as the Vice President of the Liberal Democratic Party (LDP) since 2021. Asō previously served as Prime Minister of Japan from 2008 to 2009 and as Deputy Prime Minister of Japan and Minister of Finance from 2012 to 2021. He was the longest-serving Deputy Prime Minister and Minister of Finance in Japanese history, having previously served as Minister for Foreign Affairs from 2005 to 2007 and as Minister for Internal Affairs and Communications from 2003 to 2005. He leads the Shikōkai faction within the LDP.

Asō was first elected to the House of Representatives in 1979. He served in numerous ministerial roles before becoming Secretary-General of the Liberal Democratic Party (LDP) in 2008, having also held that role temporarily in 2007. He was later elected LDP President in September 2008, becoming Prime Minister the same month. He led the LDP to the worst election result in its history a year later, marking only the second time in post-war Japan that a governing party had lost re-election, and resigned as the President of the party immediately afterwards. After the LDP returned to government following the 2012 election under Shinzo Abe, Asō was appointed to the Cabinet as Deputy Prime Minister and Finance Minister, retaining those roles when Yoshihide Suga replaced Abe in 2020. After Fumio Kishida was appointed Prime Minister in October 2021, Asō was moved to the role of Vice President of the Liberal Democratic Party.

Early life and education
Asō, a Catholic, was born in Iizuka in Fukuoka Prefecture on 20 September 1940. His father, Takakichi Asō, was the chairman of the Aso Cement Company and a close associate of Prime Minister Kakuei Tanaka; his mother Kazuko Asō was Prime Minister Shigeru Yoshida's daughter. Tarō is also a great-great-grandson of Ōkubo Toshimichi, one of the Three Great Nobles regarded as the main founders of modern Japan. His younger sister, Nobuko, Princess Tomohito of Mikasa, is a cousin-in-law of Emperor Emeritus Akihito. His wife, Chikako, is the third daughter of Prime Minister Zenkō Suzuki.

Asō graduated from the Faculty of Politics and Economics at Gakushuin University, and he later attended Stanford University and the London School of Economics, though he dropped out of Stanford at the request of his Anglophile grandfather Shigeru Yoshida on account of his "lousy Californian accent." Asō initially took the examination at Sankei Shimbun, a newspaper company ran by Mizuno Shigeo, a friend of his father's, but chose to study abroad instead.

Career
After he returned to Japan from his studies abroad, he entered the Aso Industry Company in 1966. Working for the company, he lived in Brazil during the 1960s and became fluent in Portuguese.

For two years from 1970, he worked in the diamond mining industry in Sierra Leone as a local representative of the Asō family at a new mining area offered by a local authority after the nationalization of the diamond industry in the country. He was forced to return to Japan at the outbreak of civil unrest in the country.

He served as president of the Aso Mining Company from 1973 to 1979. He was also a member of the Japanese shooting team at the 1976 Summer Olympics in Montreal and President of the Japan Junior Chamber in 1978.

Political career
Asō is affiliated with the openly historical negationist organization Nippon Kaigi.

Cabinet Minister
He joined the Cabinet of Jun'ichirō Koizumi in 2003 as Minister of Internal Affairs and Communications. On 31 October 2005, he became Minister for Foreign Affairs. There has been some speculation that his position in the Cabinet was due to his membership in the Kōno Group, an LDP caucus led by pro-Chinese lawmaker Yōhei Kōno: by appointing Asō as Minister for Foreign Affairs, Koizumi may have been attempting to "rein in" Kōno's statements critical of Japanese foreign policy.

Candidate for the LDP Leadership
Asō was one of the final candidates to replace Koizumi as prime minister in 2006, but lost the internal party election to Shinzo Abe by a wide margin. Both Abe and Asō are conservative on foreign policy issues and have taken confrontational stances towards some East Asian nations, particularly North Korea and, to a lesser extent, the People's Republic of China. Abe was considered a more "moderate" politician than the more "hard-line" Asō, and led Asō in opinion polling within Japan. Asō's views on multilateralism are suggested in a 2006 speech, "Arc of Freedom and Prosperity: Japan's Expanding Diplomatic Horizons".

Asō acknowledged that he would most likely lose to Fukuda, but said that he wanted to run so that there would be an open election, saying that otherwise LDP would face criticism for making its choice "through back-room deals". In the President election, held on 23 September, Fukuda defeated Asō, receiving 330 votes against 197 votes for Asō.

On 1 August 2008, Fukuda appointed Asō as Secretary-General of LDP, a move that solidified Asō's position as the number two-man in the party.

Prime Minister of Japan

Unexpectedly on 1 September 2008, Fukuda announced his resignation as Prime Minister. Five LDP members including Asō ran for new party President to succeed Fukuda. On 21 September, one day before votes of Diet party members, Asō reportedly told a crowd of supporters outside Tokyo: "The greatest concern right now is the economy." "America is facing a financial crisis ... we must not allow that to bring us down as well." Finally on 22 September, Asō did win. He was elected as President of LDP with 351 of 525 votes (217 from 384 Diet party members, 134 from 47 prefecture branches); Kaoru Yosano, Yuriko Koike, Nobuteru Ishihara, Shigeru Ishiba got 66, 46, 37, 25 votes respectively.

Two days later on 24 September, Asō was designated by the Diet as Prime Minister, and was formally appointed to the office by the Emperor on that night. In the House of Representatives (lower house), he garnered 337 out of 478 votes cast; in the House of Councillors (upper house), Ichirō Ozawa, President of the main opposition Democratic Party of Japan, was named through two times of ballots. Because no agreement was reached at a joint committee of both Houses, the resolution of the House of Representatives became the resolution of the Diet, as is stipulated in the Constitution. Asō reportedly said, "If you look at the current period, it's not a stable one." and "These are turbulent times with the financial situation and everything else."

Later on the same day as his election as Prime Minister, Asō personally announced his new Cabinet (this is normally done by the Chief Cabinet Secretary). His Cabinet was markedly different from the preceding Cabinet under Fukuda. Five of its members had never previously served in the Cabinet, and one of them, 34-year-old Yūko Obuchi, was the youngest member of the Cabinet in the post-war era.

Prime Minister Asō flew to Washington to meet with United States President Barack Obama in February 2009. He was the first foreign leader to visit the Obama White House; however, reports suggested that the new administration was interested less in giving Asō a political boost than in sending a message that Japan continues to be an important ally and partner – a low-risk, high-payoff gesture for both Asō and Obama.

After his election as prime minister Asō was expected to dissolve the lower house to clear the way for a general election. But he repeatedly stressed the need for a functioning government to face the economic crisis and ruled out an early election. Only after passage of the extra budget for fiscal 2009 in May and facing internal pressure from the LDP after a series of defeats in regional elections – most notably the Tokyo prefectural election on 12 July – he decided to announce a general election for 30 August 2009. He dissolved the House of Representatives on 21 July 2009. The LDP lost by a landslide to the Democratic Party of Japan, in the face of record levels of post-war unemployment. Accepting responsibility for the worst (and second-only) defeat of a sitting government in modern Japanese history, Asō immediately resigned as LDP president.

Deputy Prime Minister and Minister of Finance
When Shinzo Abe returned to the Prime Minister's office in December 2012, Aso is appointed Deputy Prime Minister and Minister of Finance. He is the first former Japanese Prime Minister to subsequently serve as Deputy Prime Minister. Following Shinzo Abe's second resignation as Prime Minister in August 2020 due to a resurgence of ulcerative colitis, many speculated Aso would launch a leadership bid. He took many people aback when he announced that he would not seek the post. Aso maintained his position as Deputy Prime Minister under Abe’s successor Yoshihide Suga, until Suga himself resigned in September 2021 and was succeeded by Fumio Kishida. Aso became the Vice President of the Liberal Democratic Party following Suga’s resignation.

Controversial statements
In 2001, as Minister of Finance, he was quoted as saying he wanted to make Japan a country where "rich Jews" would like to live.

On 15 October 2005, during the opening ceremony of the Kyushu National Museum which also displays how other Asian cultures have influenced Japanese cultural heritage, he praised Japan for having "one culture, one civilization, one language, and one ethnic group", and stated that it was the only such country in the world. This statement sparked controversy for what critics described as invoking Japan's imperialist and racist past.

At a lecture in Nagasaki Prefecture, Asō referred to a Japanese peace initiative on the Middle East, stating, "The Japanese were trusted because they had never been involved in exploitation there, or been involved in fights or fired machine guns. Japan is doing what the Americans can't do. It would probably be no good to have blue eyes and blond hair. Luckily, we Japanese have yellow faces."

Kyodo News reported that he had said on 4 February 2006, "our predecessors did a good thing" regarding compulsory education implemented during Japan's colonization of Taiwan.

On 21 December 2005, he said China was "a neighbour with one billion people equipped with nuclear bombs and has expanded its military outlays by double digits for 17 years in a row, and it is unclear as to what this is being used for. It is beginning to be a considerable threat". On 28 January 2006, he called for the emperor to visit the controversial Yasukuni Shrine. He later backtracked on the comment, but stated that he hoped such a visit would be possible in the future.

Mainichi Daily News reported that on 9 March 2006 he referred to Taiwan as a "law-abiding country", which drew strong protest from Beijing, which considers the island a part of China.

On 23 September 2008, Akahata, the daily newspaper published by Japanese Communist Party, released a compiled list of these and other statements as the front-page article criticizing Asō. This compilation as well as similar lists of blunders have been frequently cited in the Japanese media.

Yahoo! News reported that he had said on 9 January 2009, "To work is good. It's completely different thinking from the Old Testament."

While speaking at a meeting of the National Council on Social Security Reform, in 2013, Asō referred to patients with serious illness as "tube persons" and remarked that they should be "allowed to die quickly" if they desired it. "Heaven forbid I should be kept alive if I want to die", he is quoted as saying. "You cannot sleep well when you think it's all paid by the government. This won't be solved unless you let them hurry up and die."

In 2014, while campaigning in Sapporo for the general election, Asō said that rising social welfare costs were not solely due to an aging population. He said, "There are many people who are creating the image that (the increasing number of) elderly people is bad, but more problematic is people who don't give birth". The comment was labeled as insensitive to those who are not able to have children for biological or economic reasons.

The Guardian reported on 30 August 2017, that he said, "Hitler, who killed millions of people, was no good even if his motive was right." He later retracted the remarks.

According to The Japan Times, Asō "raised eyebrows" in June 2018 when he stated that the large support towards the LDP among voters under 35 in the 2017 general election was due to that demographic being less inclined than older Japanese to read newspapers, which had been critical of Abe's handling of cronyism scandals.

In May 2018, Asō downplayed alleged sexual harassment charges against his ministry's top bureaucrat by saying that "there is no such thing as a sexual harassment charge." When asked to comment on a formal complaint submitted to his ministry on the alleged sexual harassment, Asō remarked that his "only thought was that it would have been easier to read if they used a bigger font."

In October 2021, during Asō's speech for an LDP candidate in Otaru said that Hokkaido rice "has become tastier thanks to (global) warming," also adding that the rice "used to be unsalable" but now tastier and even exported "because of higher temperatures." Additionally he made the statement that people often associate global warming and the warmer temperature it brings with it as a negative but that there can be "something good" that can come out of it.

Aso Mining forced labor controversy

In mid-2008 Asō conceded that his family's coal mine, Aso Mining Company, was alleged to have forced Allied prisoners of war to work in the mines in 1945 without pay. Western media reported that 300 prisoners, including 197 Australians, 101 British, and two Dutch, worked in the mine. Two of the Australians, John Watson and Leslie Edgar George Wilkie, died while working in the Aso mine. In addition, 10,000 Korean conscripts worked in the mine between 1939 and 1945 under severe, brutal conditions in which many of them died or were injured while receiving little pay. The company, now known as the Aso Group, is run by Asō's younger brother. Asō's wife serves on its board of directors. Asō headed the company in the 1970s before going into politics.

Acting on a request from Yukihisa Fujita, the Foreign Ministry investigated and announced on 18 December 2008 that Aso Mining had, in fact, used 300 Allied POWs at its mine during World War II. The ministry confirmed that two Australians had died while working at the mine, but declined to release their names or causes of deaths for "privacy reasons". Said Fujita, "Prisoner policy is important in many ways for diplomacy, and it is a major problem that the issue has been neglected for so long." Asō has not responded to requests from former laborers to apologize for the way they were treated by his family's company.

Reading mistakes
The Japanese media noted in November 2008 that Asō often mispronounced or incorrectly read kanji words written in his speeches, even though many of the words are commonly used in Japanese. Asō spoke of the speaking errors to reporters on 12 November 2008 saying, "Those were just reading errors, just mistakes." Asō's tendency for malapropisms has led comparisons to George W. Bush (see Bushism), and the use of his name, "Tarō" as a schoolyard taunt for unintelligent children.

An anatomy professor from the University of Tokyo, Takeshi Yoro, speculated that Asō could possibly have dyslexia.

Nonaka incident
In 2001, Asō, along with Hiromu Nonaka, was among the LDP's chief candidates to succeed Yoshirō Mori as prime minister of Japan. During a meeting of LDP leaders at which Nonaka was not present, Asō reportedly told the assembled group, "We are not going to let someone from the buraku become the prime minister, are we?" Asō's remark was apparently a reference to Nonaka's burakumin, a social minority group in Japan, heritage.

Nonaka subsequently withdrew as a candidate. Asō eventually lost the appointment to Jun'ichirō Koizumi. Asō's comment about Nonaka's heritage was revealed in 2005. Asō denied that he had made the statement, but Hisaoki Kamei, who was present at the 2001 meeting, stated in January 2009 that he had heard Asō say something, "to that effect". Nonaka said that he would "never forgive" Asō for the comment and went on to state that Asō was a "misery" to Japan.

Personal life
Asō is married to Chikako Suzuki, who currently serves as the director of the Asō Group and is the daughter of former Prime Minister Zenkō Suzuki. The couple got married in 1983 and they have 2 children, namely Masatoyo and Ayako. Masatoyo served as the Niwango, the company behind the video-sharing service website Niconico in 2005 before being absorbed by Dwango in 2015. Asō is also the elder brother of Nobuko, Princess Tomohito of Mikasa and serves as the uncle of Princess Akiko of Mikasa and Princess Yōko of Mikasa.

Fondness for fine dining
In October 2008, the Japanese media reported that Asō dined out or drank in restaurants and bars in luxury hotels almost nightly. When asked about it, Asō stated, "I won't change my style. Luckily I have my money and can afford it." Asō added that if he went anywhere else, he would have to be accompanied by security guards which would cause trouble.

According to the Asahi Shimbun, Asō dined out or drank at bars 32 times in September 2008, mainly at exclusive hotels. Asō's predecessor, Yasuo Fukuda, dined out only seven times in his first month in office. Both of the LDP's opposition parties have called Asō's frequent outings inappropriate. Asō's Chief Cabinet Secretary, Jun Matsumoto, commented on the issue by saying that Asō's frequent trips to restaurants "is his lifestyle and philosophy, and I am not in a position to express my opinion. If only there were more appropriate places when considering security issues and not causing trouble for other customers."

Net worth
According to The Japan Times in 2022, Tarō Asō is the wealthiest member of Japan's National Diet. While Taro Aso's exact net worth is unknown it is estimated that his net worth is $5 billion US Dollars. This would make him not just one of the wealthiest politicians in Japan but one of the wealthiest politicians in the world. 80% of his estimated wealth is inherited while 20% of his estimated wealth has been earned by him.

Manga
Asō argues that embracing Japanese pop culture can be an important step to cultivating ties with other countries, hoping that manga will act as a bridge to the world. He is referred to as an otaku.

Asō has been a fan of manga since childhood. He had his family send manga magazines from Japan while he was studying at Stanford University. In 2003, he described reading about 10 or 20 manga magazines every week (making up only part of Asō's voracious reading) and talked about his impression of various manga extemporaneously. In 2007, as Minister for Foreign Affairs, he established the International Manga Award for non-Japanese manga artists.

It was reported that he was seen reading the manga Rozen Maiden in Tokyo International Airport, which earned him the sobriquet "His Excellency Rozen". He admitted in an interview that he had read the manga; however, he said he did not remember whether he had read it in an airport. He is a fan of Golgo 13, a long-running manga about an assassin for hire.

Asō's candidacy for the position of Japanese Prime Minister actually caused share-value to rise among some manga publishers and companies related to the manga industry.

Religion

As a Catholic, Asō belongs to the small minority of Japanese Christians, but he has not emphasized his religiosity. Asō is the seventh Christian prime minister of Japan, after Takashi Hara, Korekiyo Takahashi, Tetsu Katayama, Ichirō Hatoyama, Masayoshi Ōhira, and his own grandfather Shigeru Yoshida. His Christian name is Francisco (フランシスコ).

Family tree

Ancestry
Incorporates information from the Japanese Wikipedia article

Asō is a patrilineal descendant of the Asō clan and is maternally descended from Ōkubo Toshimichi through his son Count Makino Nobuaki. Through his paternal grandmother the Hon. Kanō Natsuko, he descends from the Tachibana clan of the Miike Domain and from a cadet branch of the Ōkubo clan, who ruled the Odawara Domain.

Honours
 Grand Cross with diamonds of the Order of the Sun, 2008

Bibliography
 Takashi Hirose (広瀬隆); 『私物国家 日本の黒幕の系図』 Tokyo:Kobunsha (1997) Genealogy14

References

External links

 Official website 
 Official website of Prime Minister of Japan and His Cabinet
 Prime Minister Taro Aso's address to the 63rd session of the United Nations General Assembly, 25 September 2008

|-

|-

|-

|-

|-

|-

1940 births
Living people
20th-century Roman Catholics
21st-century Japanese politicians
21st-century Roman Catholics
21st-century prime ministers of Japan
Alumni of the London School of Economics
Articles containing video clips
Asian Games medalists in shooting
Japanese mining businesspeople
Gakushuin University alumni
Grand Crosses with Diamonds of the Order of the Sun of Peru
Deputy Prime Ministers of Japan
Economic planning ministers of Japan
Foreign ministers of Japan
Ministers of Finance of Japan
Japanese businesspeople
Japanese expatriates in the United Kingdom
Japanese expatriates in the United States
Japanese political writers
Japanese racehorse owners and breeders
Japanese Roman Catholics
Japanese male sport shooters
Japanese sportsperson-politicians
Junior Chamber International
Presidents of the Liberal Democratic Party (Japan)
Members of Nippon Kaigi
Members of the House of Representatives (Japan)
Ministers of Internal Affairs of Japan
Olympic shooters of Japan
People from Iizuka, Fukuoka
Prime Ministers of Japan
Roman Catholic writers
Shooters at the 1974 Asian Games
Shooters at the 1976 Summer Olympics
Stanford University alumni
Writers from Fukuoka Prefecture
Asian Games gold medalists for Japan
Asian Games silver medalists for Japan
Medalists at the 1974 Asian Games
Politicians from Fukuoka Prefecture
Recipients of the Paralympic Order